Arthur Elliott Gibbs (28 December 1872 – 8 August 1940) was an Australian rules footballer who played for the Collingwood Football Club in the Victorian Football League (VFL).

Notes

External links 

		
Arthur Gibbs's profile at Collingwood Forever

1872 births
1940 deaths
Australian rules footballers from Victoria (Australia)
Collingwood Football Club (VFA) players
Collingwood Football Club players